David Edward Coombs (born July 6, 1969) is a United States military defense counsel known for his role in several high-profile cases.

Coombs spent twelve years on active duty service with the United States Army Judge Advocate General's Corps. During this time, he was an acting chief of military justice, senior capital defense counsel, and judicial advisor for the Iraqi Central Criminal Court, and was certified as a military judge.

He was professor of law at The Judge Advocate General's Legal Center and School (TJAGLCS) in Charlottesville, Virginia during 2006–2009, and in 2007 he was a co-supervisor in the University of Virginia Law Extramural (Moot Court) Advocacy Team. Since his promotion to lieutenant colonel, he continues to teach trial advocacy and criminal law at TJAGLCS as a reserve officer. Coombs is also an adjunct law professor of criminal procedure and trial advocacy at the Roger Williams University School of Law in Bristol, Rhode Island.

From 2003 to 2005, he served as one of four defense counsel in the United States v. Sergeant Hasan Akbar case, a matter which received wide coverage.

In 2009, Coombs left active duty service and began a private practice specializing in defending members of the United States Army. From 2010 to 2013, he represented U.S. Army Private First Class Chelsea Manning, who was convicted of improper release of classified information to WikiLeaks.

Publications
 "Uncharged Misconduct – The Edge is Never Dull", The Army Lawyer, May 2007
 Dictionary of Common Evidentiary Issues, The Judge Advocate General's Legal Center and School (TJAGLCS), 2007, 2008
 Advanced Evidence Deskbook, The Judge Advocate General's Legal Center and School (TJAGLCS) 2006–2008.
 "Pass Go, Collect $200.00, and Hire Yourself an Expert – Article 46 and the Right to Expert Assistance", The Army Lawyer, June 2008
 "United States v. Blazier: So Exactly Who Needs an Invitation to the Dance?", The Army Lawyer, July 2010

References

External links
 The Law Office of David E. Coombs homepage

1969 births
Living people
American lawyers
United States Army Judge Advocate General's Corps